Kumasi Technical Institute is a coeducational second-cycle technical school in Kumasi in the Ashanti Region of Ghana

History
The school was established in 1976 with support from the government of Ghana.

See also

 Education in Ghana
 List of senior high schools in the Ashanti Region

References

External links
 , the school's official website

1976 establishments in Ghana
Educational institutions established in 1976
High schools in Ghana
Education in Kumasi
Public schools in Ghana
Technical schools